La Beauté du diable (literally "the beauty of the devil"; originally released in the UK and USA as Beauty and the Devil) is a 1950 Franco-Italian fantasy film drama directed by René Clair. A tragicomedy set in the early 19th century, it is about an ageing alchemist, Henri Faust, who is given the chance to be eternally young by the devil Mephistopheles. It is loosely adapted from the classic early 19th-century verse play Faust by Johann Wolfgang von Goethe.

Cast
Michel Simon as Mephistopheles / Old Professor Henri Faust 
Gérard Philipe as Young Henri Faust / Young-looking Mephistopheles 
Nicole Besnard as  Marguerite, the gypsy girl
Raymond Cordy as  Antoine, the servant
Simone Valère as  La Princesse 
Carlo Ninchi as  Le Prince  
Gaston Modot as  Gypsy  
Tullio Carminati as Diplomat 
Paolo Stoppa as  Official

Release and reception
In 2013, the Cohen Film Collection released the Beauty and the Devil on DVD and Blu-ray. Besides the film, which was reconstructed (with bad audio), the film offers a 2010 documentary on the film itself. Ian Jane of the DVDTalk said in his closing comments regarding the Blu-ray release: "Beauty Of The Devil is slick, it's stylish and it's wonderfully shot meaning that not only is the creative way in which the story is told compelling and interesting but that it is as much a treat for the eyes as it is for the mind. The performances are good and Clair does some interesting things with his take on the story of Faust. This may be an atypical take on the classic tale, but it works incredibly well."

Awards
The film was nominated or Best Film at the 1951 BAFTA Awards and won two awards at the Italian National Syndicate of Film Journalists with a Silver Ribbon Best Actor award going to Michel Simon and best Best Production Design to Aldo Tommasini and Léon Barsacq.

References

External links

1950s romantic fantasy films
1950s fantasy drama films
French black-and-white films
Italian black-and-white films
French fantasy drama films
Films directed by René Clair
1950s French-language films
Works based on the Faust legend
Films set in the 19th century
1950 drama films
1950s French films
1950s Italian films